Burmerange is a village in south-eastern Luxembourg. It is part of the canton of Remich, which is part of the district of Grevenmacher.

It used to be a commune until it was merged into Schengen (along with Wellenstein) in 2011.

, the village of Burmerange, which lies in the south-east of the commune, had a population of 173.

Former commune
The former commune consisted of the villages:

 Burmerange
 Elvange
 Emerange
 Froumillen
 Weidemillen

References

Schengen, Luxembourg
Villages in Luxembourg
Former communes of Luxembourg